Arthur Benjamin Skidmore (August 10, 1922 – December 4, 2012) was a Canadian football player who played for the Toronto Argonauts. He won the Grey Cup with them in 1945, 1946 and 1947.

References

Canadian football people from Toronto
Toronto Argonauts players
Canadian football punters
Players of Canadian football from Ontario
Canadian football running backs
1922 births
2012 deaths